Annelies Knoppers is a former college volleyball coach. She coached the Michigan State women's volleyball team for 11 seasons, compiling an overall record of 250-197-18. She was Michigan State's head coach when the Big Ten Conference began sponsoring women's volleyball.

Coaching career

Michigan State
Knoppers was the third coach of the Michigan State women's volleyball team, and coached for the Spartans for eleven seasons.

Her head coaching career debuted in 1974, where the team opened with a tournament sponsored by the Michigan Women's Volleyball Association. In her second year of coaching, Michigan State qualified for the Association of Intercollegiate Athletics for Women (AIAW) championships, one of 24 teams to be invited to the tournament. The team finished with an overall record of 38-2, won the Big Ten tournament and the state tournament, and finished third in the Midwest Regionals. The team finished ninth in the AIAW championships. She returned eight of those players to compete the next year.

In the 1976 season, Knoppers' Spartans finished the season 35-6. They improved on their 1975 finish in the Midwest Regionals, this time securing a win. They were seeded eighth in the 24 team AIAW tournament.

Knoppers finished her career at Michigan State with a record of 250-197-18. She retired to pursue a teaching career.

Head coaching record

References

American volleyball coaches
Living people
Year of birth missing (living people)
Michigan State Spartans women's volleyball coaches